Yolanda Evette Griffith (born March 1, 1970) is an American professional basketball hall of fame player who played in both the ABL and WNBA. A former WNBA MVP, she is considered one of the greatest rebounders and defensive players in the history of Women's Basketball. She last played in the WNBA as a member of the Indiana Fever. In 2011, she was voted in by fans as one of the top 15 players in WNBA history. She is sometimes called by her nicknames: "Yo" and "Yo-Yo".  Since retiring from the professional ranks, Griffith was as assistant coach at the University of Massachusetts Amherst. She is currently an assistant coach with the Boston College Eagles. Griffith was inducted into the 2014 Women's Basketball Hall of Fame's class on her first year of eligibility.

High school and college 
Born in Chicago, Illinois, she attended George Washington Carver High School in the Chicago area.  In her senior year (1988–1989), she was named in Parade Magazines All-American basketball team, as well as first team All-America in softball.

She was offered a scholarship to play for the women's basketball team at the University of Iowa, but had to cancel it after she gave birth to her daughter, Candace.

Afterward, she attended Palm Beach Junior College in Lake Worth, Florida, where she earned Junior College All-America honors in 1990-91.  She later transferred to Florida Atlantic University, which was then a Division II school, where she graduated in 1993, earning Kodak Division II Player of the Year honors. While in school, she supported herself and her daughter by working for a car repossession company.

 American Basketball League 
In 1997, she joined the American Basketball League (ABL) after playing pro basketball in Germany.  Griffith was selected by the Long Beach Stingrays as the number one pick overall in the ABL players draft.  In their only season, Griffith led the Stingrays to the brink of the ABL title, only to lose to the defending champions, the Columbus Quest. Griffith was named the 1997–1998 ABL Defensive Player of the Year and to the All-ABL first team.  She finished second in the ABL's 1998 Most Valuable Player voting to her future 2000 Summer Olympics teammate Natalie Williams.

When the Long Beach franchise folded after the end of the 1997–98 season, she was dealt to the expansion Chicago Condors, in her hometown.  She played there only briefly, however, as the league folded on December 22, 1998. Prior to that, Griffith ranked fifth among league leaders in scoring (17.2 ppg), first in rebounding (12.3 rpg), 19th in assists (2.6 apg), second in steals (3.3 spg), and second in blocked shots (1.3 bpg).

 WNBA career 
The Sacramento Monarchs selected Griffith as the no. 2 overall draft pick in the 1999 WNBA Draft.  She is a seven-time WNBA All-Star, and won the WNBA's MVP, Newcomer of the Year and Defensive Player awards in 1999.

In 2001, Griffith set the WNBA single-season record for most offensive rebounds with 162.

In 2005, the Monarchs won their first WNBA title over the Connecticut Sun, three games to one in a best-of-five series. Griffith was named Finals MVP.

On April 8, 2008, after nine seasons with the Sacramento Monarchs, Griffith signed with the Seattle Storm.

On February 20, 2009, Griffith signed with the Indiana Fever, after a one-year stint with the Storm.

On June 9, 2009, Griffith tore her achilles tendon in a game against the Seattle Storm, her former team. She was out for the season, and since she retired at the end of the season, it ended her career. In 2011, she was voted in by fans as one of the top 15 players in the fifteen-year history of the WNBA. In 2016, Griffith was once again honoured by the WNBA in the WNBA Top 20@20 in celebration of the league's 20th season.

WNBA career statistics

Regular season

|-
| align="left" | 1999
| align="left" | Sacramento
| 29 || 29 || 33.8 || .451 || .000 || .617 || style="background:#D3D3D3"|11.3° || 1.6 || style="background:#D3D3D3"|2.5° || 1.9 || 2.28 || 18.8|-
| align="left" | 2000
| align="left" | Sacramento
| 32 || 32 || 32.1 || .535 || .000 || .706 || 10.3 || 1.5 || 2.6 || 1.9 || 2.56 || 16.3
|-
| align="left" | 2001
| align="left" | Sacramento
| 32 || 31 || 33.7 || .522 || .000 || .720 || style="background:#D3D3D3"|11.2° || 1.7 || 2.0 || 1.2 || 2.34 || 16.2
|-
| align="left" | 2002
| align="left" | Sacramento
| 17 || 17 || 33.9 || .520 || .000 || .803 || 8.7 || 1.1 || 0.9 || 0.8 || 2.65 || 16.9
|-
| align="left" | 2003
| align="left" | Sacramento
| 34 || 34 || 29.9 || .485 || .000 || .774 || 7.3 || 1.4 || 1.7 || 1.1 || 2.21 || 13.8
|-
| align="left" | 2004
| align="left" | Sacramento
| 34 || 34 || 30.3 || .519 || .000 || .853 || 7.2 || 1.2 || style="background:#D3D3D3"|2.2° || 1.2 || 1.74 || 14.5
|-
|style="text-align:left;background:#afe6ba;"|  2005†
| align="left" | Sacramento
| 34 || 33 || 28.3 || .485 || .000 || .707 || 6.6 || 1.5 || 1.2 || 0.9 || 2.00 || 13.8
|-
| align="left" | 2006
| align="left" | Sacramento
| 34 || 34 || 25.1 || .457 || .000 || .751 || 6.4 || 1.6 || 1.3 || 0.5 || 1.94 || 12.0
|-
| align="left" | 2007
| align="left" | Sacramento
| 32 || 32 || 23.1 || .502 || .000 || .658 || 4.6 || 1.5 || 1.0 || 0.4 || 2.03 || 9.0
|-
| align="left" | 2008
| align="left" | Seattle
| 30 || 30 || 21.9 || .462 || .000 || .648 || 6.3 || 1.5 || 1.4 || 0.6 || 1.70 || 7.2
|-
| align="left" | 2009
| align="left" | Indiana
| 3 || 0 || 13.7 || .500 || .000 || .778 || 2.3 || 0.0 || 0.0 || 0.7 || 1.00 || 6.3
|-
| align="left" | Career
| align="left" |11 years, 3 teams
| 311 || 306 || 28.8 || .506 || .000 || .713 || 7.9 || 1.5 || 1.7 || 1.0 || 2.11 || 13.6

Postseason

|-
| align="left" | 2000
| align="left" | Sacramento
| 2 || 2 || 39.0 || .522 || .000 || .625 || style="background:#D3D3D3"|12.0° || 1.0 || 0.5 || 0.5 || 2.00 || 14.5
|-
| align="left" | 2001
| align="left" | Sacramento
| 5 || 5 || 36.2 || .478 || .000 || .764 || 8.8 || 1.4 || 1.6 || 1.2 || 2.20 || 21.2|-
| align="left" | 2003
| align="left" | Sacramento
| 6 || 6 || 33.3 || .537 || .000 || .912 || 8.8 || 1.2 || 1.2 || 1.0 || 2.00 || 17.2
|-
| align="left" | 2004
| align="left" | Sacramento
| 6 || 6 || 34.0 || .492 || .000 || .833 || 8.2 || 1.3 || 2.0 || 1.0 || 2.00 || 13.7
|-
|style="text-align:left;background:#afe6ba;"| 2005†
| align="left" | Sacramento
| 8 || 8 || 30.8 || .491 || .000 || .711 || 8.3 || 1.4 || 1.2 || 0.5 || 1.25 || 17.3
|-
| align="left" | 2006
| align="left" | Sacramento
| 9 || 9 || 26.3 || .485 || .000 || .765 || 7.1 || 1.8 || 1.1 || 0.6 || 1.11 || 14.8
|-
| align="left" | 2007
| align="left" | Sacramento
| 3 || 3 || 23.7 || .409 || .000 || .889 || 6.0 || 0.3 || 0.7 || 0.3 || 2.33 || 8.7
|-
| align="left" | 2008
| align="left" | Seattle
| 3 || 3 || 29.0 || .214 || .000 || .875 || 6.3 || 1.7 || 3.0 || 1.3' || 1.67 || 4.3
|-
| align="left" | Career
| align="left" |8 years, 2 teams
| 42 || 42 || 31.1 || .484 || .000 || .786 || 8.0 || 1.4 || 1.4 || 0.8 || 1.69 || 15.0

Playing overseas 
Shortly after graduating from college, Griffith began her professional basketball playing career in Germany, where she played from 1993 to 1997. In 1997, she finished as the top scorer and rebounder in the Euroleague Women, averaging 24.7 points and 16.0 rebounds per game.

During the WNBA offseason, Griffith has played extensively overseas, usually on teams and leagues that feature other WNBA players. In 2003 and 2004, she played for a UMMC Ekaterinburg.

Europe
 1993–97:  DJK Wildcats Aschaffenburg
 2000–02:  Lavezzini Basket Parma
 2003–04, 2005-06:  UMMC Ekaterinburg

Olympics 
Griffith has twice been a member of the U.S. National Women's Basketball team. She won Gold Medals at the Summer Olympics in both 2000 and 2004.
Griffith will serve as a member of the USA Basketball Women's Development National Team Committee from 2013-2016.  The Women's Developmental National Team committees will select coaches and athletes for USA Basketball teams competing in the 2013 and 2015 FIBA Americas U16 Championships; and the 2014 and 2016 FIBA U17 World Championships. The Men's Developmental National Team Committee also selects staff and players for the annual Nike Hoop Summit.

Coaching career 

In 2011, Griffith accepted an assistant coach position with Ivy League university, Dartmouth, located in Hanover, NH. In her first season with the Big Green the Dartmouth post players made great strides. Griffith was instrumental in the development of Arianne Hunter and Tia Dawson. Dawson, who was the Big Green's top rebounder and the top shot blocker in the Ivy League, was twice named Ivy League Rookie of the Week.
In 2013, Griffith was named the First Assistant Coach for Lafayette College a member of the Patriot League. She was an assistant coach for Joanna Bernabei-MacNamee at the University of Albany. When Bernabei-MacNamee was named as the new head coach at Boston College in 2018, she brought Griffith along as her assistant. Griffith has been instrumental in the development of post players at BC.

Notes

References

External links
 
 USA Basketball Player Profile
 2004 WNBA article: "Ambassadors Of The Game"
 October 14, 2005 Sacramento Bee article: "Monarchs' Griffith finally has a legacy"
 Griffith signs with the Storm

1970 births
Living people
African-American basketball players
American expatriate basketball people in China
American expatriate basketball people in Germany
American expatriate basketball people in Italy
American expatriate basketball people in Russia
American women's basketball coaches
American women's basketball players
Basketball players at the 2000 Summer Olympics
Basketball players at the 2004 Summer Olympics
Basketball players from Chicago
Centers (basketball)
Chicago Condors players
Florida Atlantic Owls women's basketball players
Henan Phoenix players
Indiana Fever players
Junior college women's basketball players in the United States
Long Beach Stingrays players
Medalists at the 2000 Summer Olympics
Medalists at the 2004 Summer Olympics
Olympic gold medalists for the United States in basketball
Palm Beach State College alumni
Parade High School All-Americans (girls' basketball)
Sacramento Monarchs players
Seattle Storm players
Women's National Basketball Association All-Stars
21st-century African-American sportspeople
21st-century African-American women
20th-century African-American sportspeople
20th-century African-American women
United States women's national basketball team players